Alopoglossus danieli, also known commonly as Daniel's largescale lizard, is a species of lizard in the family Alopoglossidae. The species is endemic to Colombia.

Etymology
The specific name, danieli, is in honor of Colombian monk Brother Daniel Gonzalez Patiño (1909–1988), who was Director of the Museo de Historia Natural, Instituto de La Salle in Bogotá.

Habitat

Reproduction
A. danieli is oviparous.

References

Further reading
Harris DM (1994). "Review of the Teiid Lizard Genus Ptychoglossus ". Herpetological Monographs 8: 226–275. (Ptychoglossus danieli, new species).
Hernández Morales C, Sturaro MJ, Sales Nunes PM, Lotzkat S, Peloso PLV (2020). "A species-level total evidence phylogeny of the microteiid lizard family Alopoglossidae (Squamata: Gymnophthalmoidea)". Cladistics 36 (3): 301–321. (Alopoglossus danieli, new combination).

Alopoglossus
Reptiles of Colombia
Endemic fauna of Colombia
Reptiles described in 1994
Taxa named by Dennis M. Harris
Taxobox binomials not recognized by IUCN